CQM can refer to:

 Ciudad Real Central Airport, IATA airport code
 Classical Quantum Mechanics
 Custom Quantization Matrix
 Creative Quadratic Modulaton, a sound synthesis technology developed by E-mu Systems implemented on later-model ViBRA chips to replace the internal Yamaha OPL3 FM synthesizer chips